Călinești is a commune in Argeș County, Muntenia, Romania. It is composed of twelve villages: Călinești, Ciocănești, Cârstieni, Glodu, Gorganu, Radu Negru, Râncăciov, Udeni-Zăvoi, Urlucea, Valea Corbului, Văleni-Podgoria, and Vrănești.

Natives
 Robert Geantă
 Adrian Mutu
 Ion Vlădoiu

References

Communes in Argeș County
Localities in Muntenia